Niall McLaughlin Architects is an architectural firm in London, England. Niall McLaughlin established the practice in 1991.  He has been described as "a favourite with Oxbridge clients"; as of 2022, McLaughlin has had commissions from 15 colleges at Oxford and Cambridge universities. In 2022, the practice won the Stirling Prize for excellence in architecture for the New Library at Magdalene College, Cambridge.

Projects 
 Radcliffe Observatory Quarter at Somerville College, Oxford (2011)
 Bishop Edward King Chapel at Ripon College Cuddesdon, Oxfordshire (2013)
 Darbishire Place housing, East London, for Peabody Trust (2015)
 Extension of London Academy of Music and Dramatic Art, Hammersmith, London (2017)
 Sultan Nazrin Shah Centre at Worcester College, Oxford (2018)
 Visitor centre for Auckland Castle, County Durham (2019)
 Catherine Hughes Building at Somerville College, Oxford (2019)
 New Library at Magdalene College, Cambridge (2021)

Awards
Niall McLaughlin Architects has been shortlisted for the Stirling Prize on four occasions, winning in 2022:

2013 for Bishop Edward King Chapel, Ripon College Cuddesdon, Oxfordshire 
2015 for Darbishire Place, East London
2018 for Sultan Nazrin Shah Centre, Worcester College, Oxford
2022 for The New Library, Magdalene College, Cambridge

References

Architecture firms of England
Companies based in London
Design companies established in 1991
1991 establishments in England